Sid Smith (2 February 1889 – 28 April 1948) was an English professional boxer who competed from 1907 to 1919. He was the first officially recognised BBBofC British flyweight champion, holding the title from 1912 to 1913, and was also recognized by the International Boxing Union as the world flyweight champion in 1913.

Professional career
Born in Bermondsey, London, of Jewish heritage, Smith learned to box as a boy at the Oxford Medical Mission in Bermondsey.

He had his first professional fight on 1 February 1907, a day before his eighteenth birthday, beating Jack Brooks on points over six rounds.

He was not a hard hitter but was a fast mover, who always displayed outstanding footwork.

Smith held an early claim to the championship of England, beating Stoker Bill Hoskyne over 20 2-minute rounds in September 1911, at The Ring, Blackfriars, London on points, and beating Louis Ruddick on points in October 1911 at Liverpool Stadium.

Taking the British Empire flyweight title, December, 1911
On 4 December 1911, he was matched with Joe Wilson, at the National Sporting Club, Covent Garden, winning the Club's newly introduced English (later British) title in the flyweight division and the first Lonsdale Belt.  Wilson stepped in with two weeks notice to replace Sam Kellar, the originally scheduled boxer.  Smith was down four times in the twenty round bout for short counts, but was still reported to have won handily.

Smith arrived in New York in February 1912 with British bantamweight boxer Billy Merchant.  In a rare American bout on 24 February 1912, Smith fought a six-round draw by newspaper decision of the Philadelphia Item against talented Jewish boxer Louisiana in Philadelphia. In a fast bout, both boxers exhibited exceptional ringcraft, and footwork.  Many boxing reporters, as well as Smith's manager W.E. Ames and Smith himself, hoped for a match with American boxer and reigning world bantamweight champion Johnny Coulon for a world championship, but Coulon's handlers were not interested.  At the time, America did not have a flyweight boxing division, allowing Smith to compete against America's top bantams, including Coulon.    

On 19 September 1912, he made the first defence of his British flyweight title against Curley Walker at the Ring in Southwark, England, winning on points in a twenty-round bout.

Taking the European and world flyweight titles, April, 1913

In April 1913, he fought in Élysée Montmartre, Paris against reigning champion Frenchman Eugene Criqui for the European flyweight title and the World flyweight title, as recognized by the International Boxing Union.  The bout was billed as the 112 pound (flyweight) championship.  He beat Criqui on points over twenty rounds to take both titles.  The ruling was a unanimous decision.  An exceptional competitor, Criqui would move up a weight division and take the world bantamweight championship as well in 1923.

On 2 June 1913, he defended his titles against Bill Ladbury at Blackfriars, London. He lost the bout after holding his titles only seven weeks, suffering a technical knockout when the fight was stopped in the eleventh round.

On 24 October 1913, unable to return to the ring for the sixth round, he lost to Charles Ledoux at the Élysée Montmartre in Paris. 

He lost his last bout with his talented rival, former British bantamweight champion and future world flyweight champion, Jimmy Wilde on 27 March 1916 at Hoxton Baths, London, in a third-round knockout of a fifteen-round match.  Smith lost two previous meeting with Wilde, a knockout loss in a title bout in December 1914, and an eighth-round technical knockout loss in December 1915.  In their December 1914 bout in Liverpool, Wilde successfully defended his claim to the British 112 pound (flyweight) title.

He continued fighting until December 1919, when he had his last fight, beating Johnny Marshall in an eleventh-round technical knockout on 26 December 1919, at the Royal Albert Hall.

Life after boxing retirement
After retiring from boxing, he went into coaching boys, earning a living with a 'guess your weight' machine at markets in South London, though plagued by health problems. He trained professionals, including Joe Lynch prior to his fight with Jimmy Wilde, and was recruited to the Knights of Columbus to train United States Army boxers stationed in Britain. He also entertained, appearing on the stage with Harry Wheldon.

He had three sons, Sid, a jockey, Harry, and Bobby.

Sid Smith died on 29 April 1948, and his funeral was held on 4 May at St. Patrick's Cemetery in Leytonstone.

Professional boxing record
All information in this section is derived from BoxRec, unless otherwise stated.

Official record

All newspaper decisions are officially regarded as “no decision” bouts and are not counted in the win/loss/draw column.

Unofficial record

Record with the inclusion of newspaper decisions in the win/loss/draw column.

See also
 List of British flyweight boxing champions

References

Sources
 Maurice Golesworthy, Encyclopaedia of Boxing (Eighth Edition) (1988), Robert Hale Limited,

External links
 

|-

1889 births
1948 deaths
English male boxers
English Jews
Jewish boxers
People from Bermondsey
Flyweight boxers
European Boxing Union champions
Boxers from Greater London